Gerald Adrian Sallis Benney CBE (21 April 1930 – 26 June 2008) was a British silver and goldsmith who along with David Mellor and Robert Welch popularised stainless steel designs in post-war British homes. Like Mellor and Welch he was influenced by modern Scandinavian design and in particular Georg Jensen.

The modern Scandinavian style Gerald developed was taught to him by Berger Bergensen.

Among his works are the altar plate for Coventry Cathedral and maces for five English universities, and three in Australia (University of New England (1956); University of Newcastle (1966); and Flinders University (1969)). The Victoria and Albert Museum has a number of his pieces in its collection.

He was appointed a Commander of the Order of the British Empire (CBE) in the 1995 New Year Honours, "for services to art".

His son Simon Benney (born 1 January 1966) now runs the business and is also now recognised himself as one of the leading designers in the world; he has also held four Royal Warrants simultaneously.

References 

1930 births
2008 deaths
British goldsmiths
English silversmiths
Commanders of the Order of the British Empire